Suar or Suvar principality was a medieval statelet subject to Volga Bulgaria.

The principality appeared around the 940s CE. The population was a mix of Turkic Sabirs and local Turkic- and Uralic-speaking tribes such as the Mari. The capital was city of Suar. The ruler of Suar went by the title "Bäk" (cf. Khazar "Bek"; Turkish "Bey".)

In 975 the principality was absorbed by Volga Bulgaria. From the 11th-13th century it became a semi-autonomous province of Volga Bulgaria, until the conquest of that state by the Mongols.

List of known rulers

 Ghabdulla bine Miqail (Abd'ullah ibn Miqa'il)
 Talib bine Axmad (Talib ibn Ahmad)
 Mo'min bine Axmad (Mu'min ibn Ahmad)

Bibliography

History of Tatarstan
States and territories established in the 940s